Serge Masnaghetti (born 15 April 1934 in Mancieulles, Meurthe-et-Moselle) is a French former professional football (soccer) player. 

He spent his whole professional career at Valenciennes FC (then known as US Valenciennes-Anzin), and was the top goalscorer of the 1962-63 edition, scoring 35 goals.

External links
Profile
Career details

1934 births
Living people
Sportspeople from Meurthe-et-Moselle
French footballers
France international footballers
Valenciennes FC players
Ligue 1 players
Ligue 2 players
Association football forwards
Footballers from Grand Est